Chipalo Street is an American politician and software engineer serving as a member of the Washington House of Representatives for the 37th district. Elected in November 2022, he assumed office on January 9, 2023.

Education 
He earned a Bachelor of Applied Science and Master of Science in computer science from Brown University.

Career 
After earning his master's degree, Street returned to Seattle and began working at Microsoft on the Windows Presentation Foundation (WPF) team. Street later contributed to Microsoft Silverlight, the Extensible Application Markup Language, and Microsoft Azure. Since 2021, he has been a principal program manager in the office of CTO Kevin Scott. Street is also a Major League Soccer referee and operates a real estate investment business.

References 

Living people
People from Seattle
Engineers from Washington (state)
American software engineers
Microsoft people
Democratic Party members of the Washington House of Representatives
Businesspeople from Washington (state)
Brown University alumni
Year of birth missing (living people)